Freekstyle is a 2002 motocross racing video game for the PlayStation 2, GameCube and Game Boy Advance. There are four levels of gameplay: the circuit, a quick race, freestyle, and free run.

The game features an assortment of real-life FMX riders, which include Mike Metzger, Brian Deegan, Mike Jones, and Clifford Adoptante, as well as professional motocross riders, which include Stefy Bau, Jessica Patterson, and Greg Albertyn. Also featured as a playable character is current 790 KABC radio and sports broadcaster and model Leeann Tweeden, who was also a former motocross announcer.

Reception

The PlayStation 2 and GameCube versions received "generally favorable reviews", while the Game Boy Advance version received "mixed" reviews, according to the review aggregation website Metacritic. In Japan, where the PS2 version was localized under the name  and published by Electronic Arts on October 3, 2002, Famitsu gave it a score of 27 out of 40.

Entertainment Weekly gave the PS2 version an A− and said: "With a great two-player head-to-head mode and 100 over-the-top stunts to perform, this makes regular motocross games look downright dull by comparison". FHM gave it four stars out of five and said it had "splendid gameplay topped by highly-involving action and some nice comedy touches". The Cincinnati Enquirer gave the PS2 and GameCube versions four stars out of five: "This title feels as good as it looks thanks to its tight and responsive handling". Maxim likewise gave the PS2 version four stars out of five almost a month before its release date: "Extreme games keep getting extremer, but it would be tough to top this hellish twist on motocross racing".

Notes

References

External links
 

2002 video games
Destination Software games
EA Sports Big games
EA Sports games
Extreme sports video games
Full Fat games
Game Boy Advance games
GameCube games
Hypnos Entertainment games
Multiplayer and single-player video games
Page 44 Studios games
PlayStation 2 games
Racing video games
Sports video games
Video games developed in the United Kingdom
Video games developed in the United States
Video games set in California
Video games set in Detroit
Video games set in Nevada
Video games set in Rhode Island
Video games set in Utah
Video games set in Washington (state)
Video games set in West Virginia